John Walter Harrison (27 September 1927 – 11 December 2015), was an English professional footballer.

Career 
Harrison played as a full back in The Football League for Colchester United and for Aston Villa, although he made no appearances there. Harrison retired from the game in 1956 through injury.

Death 
Harrison died on 11 December 2015 in Colchester and left behind his wife, 3 children and 6 grandchildren, including grandson Callum Harrison who plays for Colchester United F.C. and Needham Market F.C.

References

External links
John Harrison Career Stats at Neil Brown's

1927 births
Footballers from Leicester
English footballers
Association football defenders
Colchester United F.C. players
Aston Villa F.C. players
2015 deaths